Synaphea parviflora is a shrub endemic to Western Australia.

It blooms between July and October producing yellow flowers.

It is found in the Wheatbelt region of Western Australia between Dumbleyung and Lake Grace where it grows in gravelly soils.

References

Eudicots of Western Australia
parviflora
Endemic flora of Western Australia
Plants described in 1995